The 2021–22 season will be the 54th season in the existence of Fortuna Sittard and the club's fourth consecutive season in the top flight of Dutch football. In addition to the domestic league, Fortuna Sittard will participate in this season's edition of the KNVB Cup.

Players

First-team squad

Out on loan

Transfers

In

Loans in

Out

Loans out

Pre-season and friendlies

Competitions

Overall record

Eredivisie

League table

Results summary

Results by round

Matches
The league fixtures were announced on 11 June 2021.

KNVB Cup

References

Fortuna Sittard seasons
Fortuna Sittard